Oxyphencyclimine is a muscarinic receptor antagonist, given orally to treat peptic ulcer disease and gastrointestinal spasms. It has antispasmodic and antimotility properties.

Synthesis
The reaction of chloroacetonitrile (1) with methanol and hydrogen chloride leads to the corresponding iminoether (Pinner reaction). Condensation of 2 with 3-methylaminopropylamine gives (3) gives the corresponding tetrahydropyrimidine (4). Displacement of the halogen with the sodium salt 5 affords oxyphencyclimine (6).

References

Muscarinic antagonists
Pyrimidines